Ballarat North (also known as North Ballarat) is a suburb of Ballarat, Victoria, Australia located north of Ballarat's central area. Ballarat North is bounded by Norman Street; Ballarat General Cemetery and Western Freeway to the north, Howitt Street to the south, Doodts Road to the east and the Mildura railway line to the west.

Ballarat North is partly industrial and residential in nature.

Sport
North Ballarat Football Club takes its name from the suburb, although its current homeground, Eureka Stadium is in neighbouring Wendouree.

References

External links

Suburbs of Ballarat